The flag of Ceuta is the flag of the Spanish city of Ceuta, consisting of a black and white gyronny with a central escutcheon displaying the municipal coat of arms. The civil flag omits the escutcheon.

The gyronny field is identical to that of the flag of Lisbon, to commemorate the fact of that flag having been the first raised in Ceuta by the Portuguese when they conquered the city in 1415. The city was a part of the Portuguese Empire until the end of the Iberian Union in 1640, after which it decided to remain with Spain. Thus the coat of arms of the city is nearly identical to that of the Kingdom of Portugal, showing the seven castles over the red bordure and the five escutcheons with silver roundels.

See also
Coat of arms of Ceuta
Flags of the autonomous communities of Spain

References

External links

Flag
Flags of cities in Spain
Flags introduced in 1995